José Ignacio Vildoza (born 15 January 1996) is an Argentine professional basketball player for Flamengo in the Novo Basquete Brasil and the Basketball Champions League Americas. He is a 1.91 m tall point guard.

Career
Vildoza came to Libertad at the age of 15 from Club Maipú in his home city of Córdoba. He debuted at the age of 16 in the Liga Nacional de Básquet under the guidance of coach Fernando Duró. He was with Libertad for six years, his highlight being that he was chosen as the sixth best player in the 2016–17 Liga Nacional de Básquet season after averaging 16.2 points, 3 rebounds and 3.1 assists in 27.9 minutes.

In 2017, Vildoza was hired by Trotamundos, under coach Rubén Magnano, for the final part of the 2017 Liga Profesional de Baloncesto season.

On 14 July 2017, Vildoza signed for San Lorenzo who were the current champions of the National Basketball League. Vildoza signed in time to compete in the 2017–18 Liga Nacional de Básquet season and the 2018 FIBA Americas League, the latter of which San Lorenzo won. 

On 4 June 2021, he was signed by the Croatian club Cibona, a club that currently competes in both the Croatian Basketball League and the Adriatic League simultaneously.

In 2022, Vildoza won the gold medal in the 2022 FIBA AmeriCup held in Recife, Brazil. He was one of the Argentina´s squad guards in the tournament.

References

External links
 José Vildoza at aba-liga.com

1996 births
Living people
Argentine men's basketball players
ABA League players
Point guards
Sportspeople from Córdoba, Argentina